Ferdinand de Lasteyrie (1810-1879) was a French politician. He served as a member of the Chamber of Deputies from 1842 to 1846, representing Seine, and as a member of the National Assembly from 1848 to 1851, also representing Seine. He died on May 12, 1879.

References

1810 births
1879 deaths
Politicians from Paris
Ferdinand
Moderate Republicans (France)
Members of the 6th Chamber of Deputies of the July Monarchy
Members of the 7th Chamber of Deputies of the July Monarchy
Members of the 1848 Constituent Assembly
Members of the National Legislative Assembly of the French Second Republic